Buena is a borough in Atlantic County, New Jersey, United States. As of the 2020 United States Census, the borough's population was 4,501, a decrease of 102 (−2.2%) from the 2010 census count of 4,603, which in turn reflected an increase of 730 (+18.8%) from the 3,873 counted in the 2000 census.

History
Charles K. Landis was a land developer who was the driving force behind the creation of Hammonton and Vineland. Landis also had a hand in establishing other small communities, including Landisville, in Buena Borough. He planned to make it county seat of a new county called Landis County, which would incorporate land from the surrounding counties. However, the locals were against this, and began calling him "King Landis".

Buena was incorporated as a borough by an act of the New Jersey Legislature on September 1, 1948, from portions of Buena Vista Township. The borough was reincorporated on May 18, 1949. The borough derives its name from Buena Vista Township, which in turn was named for the 1847 Battle of Buena Vista during the Mexican–American War.

In 1979, local resident Madeline Barrale authored a 115-page book illustrating the Borough's history.  Buena Borough celebrated its 50th Anniversary in 1999 with the 1st Annual "Buena Day" at Bruno Melini Park.  In 2002, the St. Padre Pio Shrine was erected by Italian-American farmers in the Landisville section of Buena and has attracted what was described by The New York Times as a "steady stream of Catholics" who come to pray at the site.

Geography
According to the United States Census Bureau, the borough had a total area of 7.57 square miles (19.62 km2), including 7.57 square miles (19.61 km2) of land and <0.01 square miles (<0.01 km2) of water (0.01%).

Unincorporated communities, localities and place names located partially or completely within the borough include Landisville and Minotola, each of which had postal facilities established with those names in 1871 and 1897, respectively.

The borough borders the municipalities of Buena Vista Township in Atlantic County; Vineland in Cumberland County; and Franklin Township in Gloucester County.

The borough is one of 56 South Jersey municipalities that are included within the New Jersey Pinelands National Reserve, a protected natural area of unique ecology covering , that has been classified as a United States Biosphere Reserve and established by Congress in 1978 as the nation's first National Reserve. Part of the borough is included in the state-designated Pinelands Area, which includes portions of Atlantic County, along with areas in Burlington, Camden, Cape May, Cumberland, Gloucester and Ocean counties.

Unexpected Road was named the seventh wackiest street name according to a 2006 poll by Car Connection website.

Demographics

2010 census

The Census Bureau's 2006–2010 American Community Survey showed that (in 2010 inflation-adjusted dollars) median household income was $53,060 (with a margin of error of +/− $14,830) and the median family income was $60,398 (+/− $6,199). Males had a median income of $47,439 (+/− $6,193) versus $35,700 (+/− $8,353) for females. The per capita income for the borough was $23,044 (+/− $2,700). About 8.2% of families and 11.3% of the population were below the poverty line, including 14.6% of those under age 18 and 9.9% of those age 65 or over.

2000 census
As of the 2000 United States census there were 3,873 people, 1,454 households, and 978 families residing in the borough. The racial makeup of the borough was 77.28% White, 7.64% African American, 0.52% Native American, 0.44% Asian, 0.03% Pacific Islander, 10.53% from other races, and 3.56% from two or more races. Hispanic or Latino of any race were 23.65% of the population.

As of the 2000 Census, 33.5% of Buena residents were of Italian ancestry, the 22nd-highest percentage of any municipality in the United States and ninth-highest in New Jersey, among all places with more than 1,000 residents identifying their ancestry.

There were 1,454 households, out of which 32.3% had children under the age of 18 living with them, 48.0% were married couples living together, 13.1% had a female householder with no husband present, and 32.7% were non-families. 28.0% of all households were made up of individuals, and 16.0% had someone living alone who was 65 years of age or older. The average household size was 2.64 and the average family size was 3.23.

In the borough the population was spread out, with 25.7% under the age of 18, 8.6% from 18 to 24, 30.1% from 25 to 44, 19.7% from 45 to 64, and 15.8% who were 65 years of age or older. The median age was 36 years. For every 100 females, there were 95.0 males. For every 100 females age 18 and over, there were 91.1 males.

The median income for a household in the borough was $35,679, and the median income for a family was $44,352. Males had a median income of $37,985 versus $23,788 for females. The per capita income for the borough was $16,717. About 11.8% of families and 18.7% of the population were below the poverty line, including 28.1% of those under age 18 and 14.1% of those age 65 or over.

Government

Local government
Buena Borough is governed under the Borough form of New Jersey municipal government, which is used in 218 municipalities (of the 564) statewide, making it the most common form of government in New Jersey. The governing body is comprised of a Mayor and a Borough Council, with all positions elected at-large on a partisan basis as part of the November general election. A Mayor is elected directly by the voters to a four-year term of office. The Borough Council is comprised of six members elected to serve three-year terms on a staggered basis, with two seats coming up for election each year in a three-year cycle. The Borough form of government used by Buena is a "weak mayor / strong council" government in which council members act as the legislative body with the mayor presiding at meetings and voting only in the event of a tie. The mayor can veto ordinances subject to an override by a two-thirds majority vote of the council. The mayor makes committee and liaison assignments for council members, and most appointments are made by the mayor with the advice and consent of the council.

, the Mayor of Buena Borough is Republican G. David Zappariello, whose term of office ends December 31, 2023. Members of the Buena Borough Council are Council President Matthew P. Walker Sr. (R, 2022), Jorge A. Alvarez (R, 2023), Gina K. Andaloro (D, 2024), Patricia A. Andaloro (D, 2024) and Joseph A. D'Alessandro III (R, 2022), with one seat vacant.

In May 2021, Republican Councilmember Aldo S. Palmieri submitted his resignation from his seat expiring in December 2023, but the council did not accept the resignation until January 2022 at which time it was accepted retroactive to May.

In July 2019, Joseph D'Alessandro was appointed to fill the seat expiring in December 2019 that had been held by Jeffrey Marolda until his resignation from office the precious month.

In October 2016, Jorge Alvarez become Buena's first Hispanic councilmember when he was chosen from three candidates nominated by the Republican municipal committee to fill the seat expiring in December 2017 that had been held by Robert L. James Jr. until his resignation.

In February 2016, the borough council selected Matthew Walker Sr. from a list of three candidates nominated by the Republican municipal committee to fill the seat expiring in December 2016 that had been held by Edward Cugini until his resignation; Walker became the first African-American to serve on the Borough Council.

After Council President Joseph Santagata resigned from office in July 2014, the Borough Council selected Robert L. James to fill Santagata's vacant council seat, while Rosalie M. Baker was chosen to succeed Santagata as Council President.

Gregory McAvaddy was sworn into office in August 2013 to fill the vacant seat of Frank DeStefano, who had resigned earlier that month to devote more time to his business. In the 2013 general election, Republican incumbents Edward S. Cugini and Jeffrey Marolda won re-election and McAvaddy won the balance of the unexpired term of office.

In 2018, the Buena Borough Police Department was disbanded. The borough entered into a shared service agreement with the Franklin Township Police Department, whose Chief of Police is Brian Zimmer. With the dissolution of Buena's police force, the borough's officers were being given an opportunity for consideration to be hired by Franklin Township.

Federal, state and county representation
Buena is located in the 2nd Congressional District and is part of New Jersey's 2nd state legislative district. Prior to the 2011 reapportionment following the 2010 Census, Buena had been in the 1st state legislative district.

 

Atlantic County is governed by a directly elected county executive and a nine-member Board of County Commissioners, responsible for legislation. The executive serves a four-year term and the commissioners are elected to staggered three-year terms, of which four are elected from the county on an at-large basis and five of the commissioners represent equally populated districts. , Atlantic County's Executive is Republican Dennis Levinson, whose term of office ends December 31, 2023. Members of the Board of County Commissioners are:

Ernest D. Coursey, District 1, including Atlantic City (part), Egg Harbor Township (part), and Pleasantville (D, 2022, Atlantic City), Chair Maureen Kern, District 2, including Atlantic City (part), Egg Harbor Township (part), Linwood, Longport, Margate City, Northfield, Somers Point and Ventnor City (R, 2024, Somers Point), Andrew Parker III, District 3, including Egg Harbor Township (part) and Hamilton Township (part) (R, Egg Harbor Township, 2023), Richard R. Dase, District 4, including Absecon, Brigantine, Galloway Township and Port Republic (R, 2022, Galloway Township), James A. Bertino, District 5, including Buena, Buena Vista Township, Corbin City, Egg Harbor City, Estell Manor, Folsom, Hamilton Township (part), Hammonton, Mullica Township and Weymouth Township (R, 2018, Hammonton), Caren L. Fitzpatrick, At-Large (D, 2023, Linwood), Frank X. Balles, At-Large (R, Pleasantville, 2024) Amy L. Gatto, Freeholder (R, 2022, Hamilton Township) and Vice Chair John W. Risley, At-Large (R, 2023, Egg Harbor Township)

Atlantic County's constitutional officers are: 
County Clerk Joseph J. Giralo (R, 2026, Hammonton), 
Sheriff Eric Scheffler (D, 2024, Northfield) and 
Surrogate James Curcio (R, 2025, Hammonton).

Politics
As of March 23, 2011, there were a total of 2,771 registered voters in Buena, of which 593 (21.4% vs. 30.5% countywide) were registered as Democrats, 764 (27.6% vs. 25.2%) were registered as Republicans and 1,414 (51.0% vs. 44.3%) were registered as Unaffiliated. There were no voters registered to other parties. Among the borough's 2010 Census population, 60.2% (vs. 58.8% in Atlantic County) were registered to vote, including 80.2% of those ages 18 and over (vs. 76.6% countywide).

In the 2012 presidential election, Democrat Barack Obama received 1,011 votes (53.2% vs. 57.9% countywide), ahead of Republican Mitt Romney with 847 votes (44.6% vs. 41.1%) and other candidates with 18 votes (0.9% vs. 0.9%), among the 1,899 ballots cast by the borough's 2,919 registered voters, for a turnout of 65.1% (vs. 65.8% in Atlantic County). In the 2008 presidential election, Democrat Barack Obama received 1,048 votes (53.0% vs. 56.5% countywide), ahead of Republican John McCain with 877 votes (44.3% vs. 41.6%) and other candidates with 31 votes (1.6% vs. 1.1%), among the 1,979 ballots cast by the borough's 2,932 registered voters, for a turnout of 67.5% (vs. 68.1% in Atlantic County). In the 2004 presidential election, Democrat John Kerry received 927 votes (49.7% vs. 52.0% countywide), ahead of Republican George W. Bush with 894 votes (47.9% vs. 46.2%) and other candidates with 14 votes (0.7% vs. 0.8%), among the 1,867 ballots cast by the borough's 2,749 registered voters, for a turnout of 67.9% (vs. 69.8% in the whole county).

In the 2013 gubernatorial election, Republican Chris Christie received 707 votes (66.0% vs. 60.0% countywide), ahead of Democrat Barbara Buono with 326 votes (30.4% vs. 34.9%) and other candidates with 10 votes (0.9% vs. 1.3%), among the 1,072 ballots cast by the borough's 2,977 registered voters, yielding a 36.0% turnout (vs. 41.5% in the county). In the 2009 gubernatorial election, Republican Chris Christie received 692 votes (50.4% vs. 47.7% countywide), ahead of Democrat Jon Corzine with 547 votes (39.8% vs. 44.5%), Independent Chris Daggett with 56 votes (4.1% vs. 4.8%) and other candidates with 29 votes (2.1% vs. 1.2%), among the 1,373 ballots cast by the borough's 2,819 registered voters, yielding a 48.7% turnout (vs. 44.9% in the county).

Education
Students in public school for pre-kindergarten through twelfth grade from Buena Borough attend the Buena Regional School District, together with students from Buena Vista Township. Students are sent to the district's high school, Buena Regional High School, for grades 9–12 from both Estell Manor City and Weymouth Township as part of sending/receiving relationships with the respective school districts.

As of the 2020–21 school year, the district, comprised of five schools, had an enrollment of 1,691 students and 150.0 classroom teachers (on an FTE basis), for a student–teacher ratio of 11.3:1. Schools in the district (with 2020–21 enrollment data from the National Center for Education Statistics) are 
Collings Lakes Elementary School with 197 students in grades K-2, 
John C. Milanesi Elementary School with 259 students in grades PreK-2, 
Dr. J.P. Cleary Elementary School with 309 students in grades 3–5, 
Buena Regional Middle School with 336 students in grades 6-8 and 
Buena Regional High School with 535 students in grades 9–12.

Borough public school students are also eligible to attend the Atlantic County Institute of Technology in the Mays Landing section of Hamilton Township or the Charter-Tech High School for the Performing Arts, located in Somers Point.

Edgarton Christian Academy is a non-denominational Christian K–8 school established in 2012.  it leases a  space in Newfield in Gloucester County, though it has plans to move to Buena. When the 76-student The Ellison School in Vineland closed in December 2019, 25 of them moved to Edgarton. The school is building a  permanent building on a  property in Buena.

Notre Dame Regional School of the Roman Catholic Diocese of Camden had one of its two campuses in Landisville, with the other in Newfield. The school closed in 2012. It had 270 students at the time of closure. That year remnants of the school formed the non-Catholic Edgarton Christian Academy. 263 of the former Notre Dame students moved to Edgarton.

Transportation

U.S. Route 40 passes through the heart of the borough, running concurrently with County Route 557. Route 54 passes through along the eastern border.

The closest limited access road is Route 55 in Vineland and Franklin. The Atlantic City Expressway can be reached by Route 54.

Notable people

People who were born in, residents of, or otherwise closely associated with Buena include:

 Sharif Mobley (born 1984), suspected member of al-Qaeda

Attractions
 Bellview Winery
 St. Padre Pio Shrine

References

External links

 Buena Borough Official Website
 Buena Regional School District
 
 School Data for the Buena Regional School District, National Center for Education Statistics

 
1948 establishments in New Jersey
Borough form of New Jersey government
Boroughs in Atlantic County, New Jersey
Populated places established in 1948